Daimiel Club de Fútbol is a football team based in Daimiel in the autonomous community of Castile-La Mancha. Founded in 1942, it plays in the 1ª Autonómica Preferente. Its stadium is Municipal de Daimiel with a capacity of 3,500 seats.

Season to season

1 seasons in Segunda División B
18 seasons in Tercera División

External links
Official website
Futbolme.com profile

Football clubs in Castilla–La Mancha
Association football clubs established in 1942
Divisiones Regionales de Fútbol clubs
1942 establishments in Spain
Province of Ciudad Real